Yueshan railway station is a railway station in Bo'ai County, Jiaozuo, Henan Province, China.  Several railways in northern China intersect at Yueshan, including the Taiyuan–Jiaozuo, Jiaozuo–Liuzhou and Xinxiang–Yueshan railways.  The Houma–Yueshan railway merges into the Jiaozuo–Liuzhou railway west of Yueshan at the Liandong railway station in Jiyuan.

References

Railway stations in Henan
Bo'ai County